The Eritrea national badminton team represents Eritrea in international badminton team competitions. It is controlled by the Eritrean National Badminton Federation, the governing body for badminton in Eritrea. The national team has competed in the African Games mixed team event.

Eritrea has yet to win a medal in badminton.

Participation in Africa Games

Current squad 
The following players were selected to represent Eritrea at the 2019 African Games.

Men
Filimon Samsom
Leykun Semere

Women
Kisanet Heyelom
Yodit Okbamichael

References 

Badminton
National badminton teams